West of Cheyenne is a 1931 American pre-Code
Western film directed by Harry S. Webb and starring Tom Tyler, Josephine Hill and Harry Woods.

Cast
 Tom Tyler as Tom Langdon 
 Josephine Hill as Bess 
 Harry Woods as Kurt Raymer, aka The Laramie Kid 
 Fern Emmett as Rose 
 Ben Corbett as Banty 
 Lafe McKee as Lafe Langdon 
 Robert D. Walker as Henchman Nevada 
 Lew Meehan as Henchman 
 Tex Palmer as Langdon Cowhand
 Slim Whitaker as Henchman Steve

Plot
Langdon tracks down the outlaw gang that murdered his father.

References

Bibliography
 Pitts, Michael R. Western Movies: A Guide to 5,105 Feature Films. McFarland, 2012.

External links
 

1931 films
1931 Western (genre) films
1930s English-language films
American black-and-white films
American Western (genre) films
Films directed by Harry S. Webb
1930s American films